Georgios Saitiotis (born 25 July 1981) is a Greek former professional footballer who played as a striker.

Career

Olympiakos Volou
In the 2004–2005 season he moved on loan to Olympiakos Volos in Beta Ethniki

Niki Volou
In the 2005–2006 season he played on loan for Niki Volos.

PAS Giannina
In summer 2006, Saitiotis signed a contract with PAS Giannina in the second division. He made 31 appearances and scored 18 goals in his first year. PAS reached in the semi finals of the Greek Cup. He made 6 appearances and scored 4 goals. He scored twice against Egaleo. His free kick against Iraklis allowed PAS to draw 1–1 in Thessaloniki. Also he scored against Iraklis at home, in Zosimades Stadium.

The following season, 2007–08 he made 31 appearances and scored 12 goals. In the season 2008–2009 he made 33 appearances and scored 20 goals contributing to the promotion of PAS Giannina in Super League Greece. In the season 2009–10 he made 25 appearances and scored 6 goals. He reached 56 goals, becoming the fourth-best scorer in club history, behind Edouardos Kontogeorgakis, Oscar Alvarez and Alfredo Glasman, who made history at Ajax of Epirus.

Veria
In summer 2010, after 4 years in PAS, Saitiotis decided to sign for the club Veria in Beta Ethniki.

AEL
In the summer of 2011 he joined AEL. On 18 December, he scored his first two goals in a 5–2 win over Anagennisi Epanomi. In February 2012, he retired as a professional footballer due to heart problems at the age of thirty.

Later years
In January 2018, Saitiotis came out of retirement signing for Moudania, playing at the amateur divisions of Chalkidiki.

Honours
PAS Giannina
 Greek Second Division promotion: 2008–09

Individual
 Top Scorer of Greek Football Cup: 2006–07 (together with Jozef Kožlej)

References

External links
 Guardian Football
 Veria Profile
 Video of Saitiotis  Two Goal of Saitiotis with PAS Giannina against Atromitos

1983 births
Living people
Greek footballers
Super League Greece players
Kassandra F.C. players
Xanthi F.C. players
Olympiacos Volos F.C. players
Niki Volos F.C. players
PAS Giannina F.C. players
Veria F.C. players
Athlitiki Enosi Larissa F.C. players
Association football forwards
People from Chalkidiki
Footballers from Central Macedonia